Lynnwood is a place located in Fayette County, Pennsylvania in the  United States of America. Its latitude is 40°7'27" North, longitude 79°50'37" West.

Midget League Football
Lynnwood was home to the now defunct Lynnwood Eagles. The Eagles were a part of the Belle Vernon Midget Football League. Their last league title came in 1998 under a team led by local legend Rick Van Pool.

Geography of Fayette County, Pennsylvania